Epinephelus heniochus, the bridled grouper or threeline rockcod, is a species of marine ray-finned fish, a grouper from the subfamily Epinephelinae which is part of the family Serranidae, which also includes the anthias and sea basses. It is native to the tropical western Pacific Ocean.

Description 
Epinephelus heniochus has a body which has a standard length that is 2.7 to 3.1 times its depth. The area between the eyes is slightly convex whereas the dorsal profile of the head is markedly convex. The preopercle is sharply angled with 2–4 large spines located at its angle. The dorsal fin contains 11 spines and 14–15 sot rays while the anal fin has 3 spines and  soft rays. The upper heaqd and body are pale brown, fading to whitish or pale pink on the lower head and body. A minority of individuals have very small brownish black spots on the body and posterior part of the head. There is an indisinct dark brown stripe which runs from the eve to rear margin of the gill cover and another darker stripe which runs from the lower edge of eye to the subopercle while a third stripe runs from front of the eye and sips between the preopercle and the gill cover. The pectoral fins are translucent greyish yellow and the lower section of caudal fin is sometimes darker than the remainder of fin. The membranes between dorsal fin spines have a yellow margin.

Distribution 
Epinephelus heniochus occurs in the tropical Western Pacific Ocean from the Anadaman Sea and the Gulf of Thailand to New Britain in Papua New Guinea, south to the Arafura Sea, Timor Sea and Gulf of Carpentaria coasts of Australia and north to Japan and South Korea.

Habitat and biology 
There is almost no published information on the biology of this species.

Taxonomy 
Epinephelus heniochus was first formally described in 1904 by the American ichthyologist Henry Weed Fowler (1878-1965) with the type locality given as Padang on Sumatra.

References 

heniochus
Fish of Thailand
Fish described in 1904